The canoeing races at the 2018 Asian Games in Jakarta and Palembang were contested in three main disciplines: the slalom from 21 to 23 August, and the sprint from 29 August to 1 September. The slalom canoe competition was held at the Bendung Rentang in Majalengka Regency, West Java; whereas the sprint events were staged in Jakabaring Lake at the Jakabaring Sport City, Palembang. Additionally, the games also contested the canoe polo discipline as demonstration sport. Also in part of canoeing event was the dragon boat event.

During a preparation meeting, West Java provincial secretary stated that the quality of the water in Bendung Rentang was polluted by sand and soil mining waste (galian C). According to Indonesian Minister of Public Works and People's Housing Basuki Hadimuljono, the quantity of water in Bandung Rentang was enough, about 15 cubic meters per second, so the speed (water) had met the standard, and to improve the water quality, sand excavation activity around the venue would be stopped for a while.

Schedule

Medalists

Slalom

Men

Women

Sprint

Men

Women

Medal table

Participating nations
A total of 228 athletes from 23 nations competed in canoeing at the 2018 Asian Games:

References

External links 
Canoe/Kayak Sprint at the 2018 Asian Games
Official Result Book – Canoe/Kayak Slalom
Official Result Book – Canoe/Kayak Sprint and TBR

 
2018 Asian Games events
2018
Asian Games
2018 Asian Games